Dabnik Peak, Trinity Peninsula 
 Dabrava Glacier, Graham Coast
 Dalchev Cove, Anvers Island 
 Dalgopol Glacier, Smith Island
 Damga Point, Astrolabe Island 
 Dañobeitia Crag, Livingston Island 
 Darvari Glacier, Nordenskjöld Coast  
 Darzalas Peak, Nordenskjöld Coast  
 Daskot Point, Oscar II Coast
 Daveri Hill, Trinity Peninsula  
 Davidov Spur, Danco Coast
 Debelt Glacier, Livingston Island  
 Debelyanov Point, Robert Island 
 Debren Pass, Sentinel Range 
 Delchev Peak, Livingston Island  
 Delchev Ridge, Livingston Island
 Deliradev Point, Anvers Island
 Delisle Inlet, Wilkins Coast  
 Delyan Point, Smith Island 
 Delyo Glacier, Sentinel Range
 Desislava Cove, Nordenskjöld Coast 
 Desudava Glacier, Nordenskjöld Coast
 Devene Point, Brabant Island
 Devesil Bight, Robert Island
 Devetaki Peak, Oscar II Coast 
 Devin Saddle, Livingston Island  
 Devnya Valley, Livingston Island 
 Mount Devol, Alexander Island
 Digges Cove, Elephant Island
 Dimcha Peak, Oscar II Coast
 Dimitrov Cove, Graham Coast  
 Dimitrova Peak, Alexander Island
 Dimkov Glacier, Brabant Island  
 Dimov Gate, Livingston Island  
 Dinea Island, Greenwich Island
 Dink Island, Trinity Island
 Diomedes Lake, Livingston Island
 Dioptra Island, Low Island 
 Diralo Point, Oscar II Coast
 Discoduratere Nunatak, Nelson Island
 Disilitsa Point, Liège Island
 Divdyadovo Glacier, Sentinel Range
 Divotino Point, Robert Island  
 Djerassi Glacier, Brabant Island
 Dlagnya Rocks, Livingston Island  
 Dobrich Knoll, Livingston Island  
 Dobrodan Glacier, Clarence Island
 Dobrudzha Glacier, Livingston Island  
 Dodelen Glacier, Brabant Island
 Dodunekov Bluff, Graham Coast
 Dolen Peak, Nordenskjöld Coast  
 Dolie Glacier, Graham Coast
 Dometa Point, Livingston Island  
 Domino Lake, Snow Island
 Domlyan Bay, Oscar II Coast
 Doriones Saddle, Brabant Island
 Doris Cove, Greenwich Island
 Dorticum Cove, Nelson Island
 Dospat Peak, Livingston Island  
 Dospey Heights, Livingston Island  
 Doyran Heights, Sentinel Range 
 Dragash Point, Dee Island  
 Dragoman Glacier, Smith Island  
 Dragor Hill, Trinity Peninsula  
 Draka Nunatak, Trinity Peninsula  
 Dralfa Point, Anvers Island  
 Drama Glacier, Sentinel Range  
 Drangov Peak, Greenwich Island  
 Dreatin Glacier, Trinity Peninsula  
 Drenta Bluff, Trinity Peninsula  
 Drinov Peak, Smith Island  
 Drong Hill, Livingston Island  
 Dropla Gap, Sentinel Range  
 Drumohar Peak, Astrolabe Island  
 Dryad Lake, Livingston Island
 Dryanovo Heights, Greenwich Island 
 Duclos-Guyot Bluff, Clarence Island 
 Dugerjav Peak, Oscar II Coast
 Duhla Peak, Oscar II Coast
 Dulo Hill, Livingston Island  
 Dupnitsa Point, Smith Island
 Duridanov Peak, Sentinel Range
 Durostorum Bay, Oscar II Coast
 Dymcoff Crag, Nordenskjöld Coast
 Dzhebel Glacier, Oscar II Coast
 Dzhegov Rock, Cornwallis Island

See also 
 Bulgarian toponyms in Antarctica

External links 
 Bulgarian Antarctic Gazetteer
 SCAR Composite Gazetteer of Antarctica
 Antarctic Digital Database (ADD). Scale 1:250000 topographic map of Antarctica with place-name search.
 L. Ivanov. Bulgarian toponymic presence in Antarctica. Polar Week at the National Museum of Natural History in Sofia, 2–6 December 2019

Bibliography 
 J. Stewart. Antarctica: An Encyclopedia. Jefferson, N.C. and London: McFarland, 2011. 1771 pp.  
 L. Ivanov. Bulgarian Names in Antarctica. Sofia: Manfred Wörner Foundation, 2021. Second edition. 539 pp.  (in Bulgarian)
 G. Bakardzhieva. Bulgarian toponyms in Antarctica. Paisiy Hilendarski University of Plovdiv: Research Papers. Vol. 56, Book 1, Part A, 2018 – Languages and Literature, pp. 104-119 (in Bulgarian)
 L. Ivanov and N. Ivanova. Bulgarian names. In: The World of Antarctica. Generis Publishing, 2022. pp. 114-115. 

Antarctica
 
Bulgarian toponyms in Antarctica
Names of places in Antarctica